There is a social organizational structure in the Yazidi community. There are three main castes, namely the Mirids, the Sheikhs, and the Pirs. Furthermore, there are positions for dignitaries in the Yazidi hierarchy.

Mîr
The Mîr (Prince) of Sheikhan is the highest political and religious authority of the entire Yezidi community. As a member of the Qatani Sheikhs, he is regarded as the legitimate successor of Sheikh Adi. The Mîr's influence reaches nearby communities, whereas in the more distant and disconnected Yezidi communities, namely of Georgia, Armenia and Syria, his influence decreases. However, in theory, particularly in diaspora, the Mir represents all Yezidis, his decisions are binding and he also maintains legislative and executive power. As the head of the spiritual council, he has the power to appoint the Baba Sheikh, administers Lalish and receives offerings from the annual journey and parading of the Sinjaq throughout the Yezidi communities. Additionally, he also wields some political influence in Iraqi politics. The current Mîr is Hazim Tahsin, but some Yezidis with opposing political affiliations decided to enact Naif Dawud as their Mîr. Hazim Tahsin is a former deputy in Kurdistan Region Parliament in Iraq. The former head was his father, Tahseen Said, who died in January 2019 in Germany, and was head of the community for nearly 75 years. The family of the Mîr resides in Ba'adra.

Baba Sheikh
The Baba Sheikh (Babê Şêx, literally "Father Sheikh") is the highest spiritual leader of all Yezidis. His post is mainly granted hereditary but he is appointed by the Mîr. He is obliged to observe long periods of fasting of 40 days in the summer and winter. The acting Baba Sheikh has to be from the Fexredîn lineage of Shemsani Sheikhs. He shall not be dismissed, and only be replaced if he dies or abandons the Yazidi faith. The current Baba Sheikh is Ali Alyas. The previous Baba Sheikh was Khurto Hajji Ismail.

The position typically hereditary and passes from father to son, although the Baba Sheikh needs to be formally appointmented by the Mir.

Sheikh

A Sheikh's official duty is to be a spiritual guide for his follower, thus Sheikhs may express sermons and impose taboos on his followers (Mirîds) and compose prayers for them. All Yezidis, including those belonging to Sheikh and Pir castes themselves, are obliged to have a Sheikh and a Pîr. A Sheikh is expected to attend important events of his followers, such as births, funerals and weddings. For this duty, the followers give a certain annual amount of money to their Sheikhs. Sheikh has the same meaning in Arabic as Pîr does in Kurdish.

Many Yezidis believe that by honouring the living Sheikh, they are worshipping the holy figure who is the eponym of his lineage. The Sheikhs are divided into three groups, the Şemsanî, Adanî and Qatanî. These groups are divided into smaller lineages and sub-lineages, i.e clans/families. The Şemsanî are believed to have lineage from the four sons of Êzdîna Mir, the last Yezidi ruler that reigned prior to Sheikh Adi's arrival in Lalish, the Adanî claim descent from Şêxisin, the great-grandson of Sheikh Adi's brother, and the Qatanî claim descent from Şêxûbekir, whom they believe to have been Sheikh Adi's kinsman. The three groups, in turn divided into further smaller sub-lineages are as follows:

Şemsanî 
The Şemsanî are divided into four branches, each descended from the four sons of Êzdîna Mîr:

 Şemsedîn – further divided into smaller lineages (listed below)
 Fexredîn – further divided into smaller lineages (listed below)
 Nasirdîn – not further divided into smaller lineages
 Sicadîn – not further divided into smaller lineages

Şêşims (Şemsedîn)
Şêx Alê Şemsa
Şêx Amadînê Şemsa
Şêx Avîndê Şemsa
Şêx Babadînê Şemsa
Şêx Bavikê Şemsa
Şêx ʿEvdalê Şemsa
Şêx Hesenê Şemsa
Şêxê Reş (Cinteyar)
Şêx Tokilê Şemsa
Şêx Xidirê Şemsa
Sitya Îs (Ês)
Sitiya Nisret
Sitiya Bilxan (Belqan)

Fexredîn
Şêx Bedir
Şêx Mendê Fexra(n)
Xatûna Fexra(n)

Adanî – Şêxisin 

 Şêx Brahîmê Xetimî
 Şêxê Êtîma
 Şêx Mûsê Sor
 Şêx Şerfedîn
 Şêx Zêndîn
 Sitiya Gul

Qatanî 

 Dewrêş Qapan
 Derwêş Cirgîn
 Derwêş Gurgîn
 Derwêş Rezwan
 Derwêş Miskîn
 Derwêş Mistaltaîn
 Dewrêş Adem, according to Yazidi oral tradition, Dewrêş Adem lived during the time of Sheikh Adi. He did not want to be a Dewrêş anymore, whereupon Sheikh Adi sent him to Xoristan to Mîr Mehmedê Xoristanî to marry his daughter, Xecîcê Xoristanî. From their marriage, Derwêş Birahîm was born.
 Derwêş Birahîm / Mîr Birahîm, lived after Sheikh Adi and was both a Derwêş and a Mîr
 Şêxûbekir
 Şêx ʿEbdilqadir
 Şêx Îsmaîlê ʿEnzelî
 Şêx Kara
 Şêx Maviyê Zar
 Şêx Mehmedê Batinî
 Şêx Sorê Sora
 Şêx Xelîfeta

Pîr

The Pîr's duties are similar to the ones of a Sheikh, he can attend the majority of the events as well which the Sheikh attends, if the Sheikh is not able to, but he is awarded just about half of the money a Sheikh receives in exchange.

Lineages of Pîr caste 

The following lineages have been recorded by Khanna Omarkhali:
Afa
Al
Alûbekir (Alobekir)
Atqatê
Axa
Bad (Bat)
Bazîd
Beʿrî
Beybûn
Biwal
Boz (Bûz)
Bû
Bûb (Bob)
Bûk
Cervan (Cerwan, Cebran, Cerva)
Çak
Çêlê
Davûd (Daudî bi(n) Derman)
Delî
Deva
Dirbês (Derbis)
ʿEvdîa
Êzîd
Gavanê Zerzan
Gerger
Hacîal
Hacxal
Hecî ʿElî (Hecî ʿElî Memîn)
Hecî Mehemed (bêzuret)
Hemedê Babê
Hemelî
Hesen
Hesen Çikêr
Hesen Çînari (Hesen Çinêrî)
Hesen Deqîq
Hesen Te ʿIk
Hesîn Pîr
Hesîn Şîrin
Hesmeman (Hesen Meman) (pîrê çil pîra 'the Pir of the Forty Pirs')
Hesnalka (Hesen Êlka)
Hesnenak (Heslemak, Heslenak)
Hêsim
Hû
Îs
Îsîbiya (Êsîbiya)
Kemala
Kewkî
Liblan (Libna, Libina)
Lûfî
Mala Bala
Mehbûf (Mebûb)
Mehed Yeşan
Mehmedê Reben
Mehmûd
Memê Reşan (Mehmedê Reşan)
Memê Şivan
Men
Mend
Mensûr
Meqlebêz (Melqebêz)
Mervan (Merwan)
Meysûr
Momin
Mûs (Mosê)
Navdar
Omerxalî (Omerê Xala)
Qedîbilban
Qelender
Qerecer
Qilêç
Reşê Heyran
Reşîd Mêravê
Sibatê (Siba)
Sinîbalê
Sînanezar
Sînexalî
Şalyar
Şamîa
Terciman
Tûskî
Tûz
Xanîa
Xefûf
Xemsî
Xetîpisî (Xetîb Pisî)
Xoşava (Xoş Afa)
Zekir (Zikir)

Peshimam
Peshimams are responsible for holding weddings ceremonies and is appointed by the Mîr amongst the family of the Peshimams. They cannot be dismissed and only be replaced in case of their passing away or abandoning the Yazidi faith.

The types of Peshimams are:

Great Peshimam (Pêşîmamê Mezin)
Peshimam of the Feqirs (Pêşîmamê Feqîran)
Peshimam of the Baba Sheikh (Pêşîmamê Bavê Şêx)

Kochek
The Kocheks are seers who are led by the Baba Sheikh. They collect wood and water among other duties they have and they also observe forty-day fasts in winter and summer, perform the duties of an absent Pir or Sheikh. They're known for their role as traditional healers and their ability to see into the future and utter prophecies as well as interpreting  dreams and communicating with the dead, supernatural and the "World of the Unseen". People visit them when they need advice, have dreams or visions and need explanations. When consulted, Kocheks ponder or dream over the request or diagnosis until they eventually determine which Yezidi saint may be useful. Several saints are associated with healing qualities, including Sheikh Mand for snake bites, Sheikh Mus and Sheikh Hassan for rheumatic and lung problems, Sherfedin for skin-related issues and Sheikh Amadin for stomach pain.

Feqir

Feqirs devote their entire lives to the service of religion and may observe all rituals, taboos and religious acts. This position is available for all Yezidis who live pious, humble and ascetic lives and receive the calling. Feqirs don't denote a distinct class within the Yezidis, however,  who hail from the clerical castes are referred to as "Feqîr Dunav", i.e. Feqîr with one honor. Feqirs wear a distinguishable outfit, made from black wool and called Kherqe which was baptised at the White Spring in Lalish. Additionally, they also wear red belts, copper rings and caps referred to as kulik, which represent Sheikh Adi's crown and for which they are sometimes referred to as Karabash ("Black heads") due to its black colour. Kherqes that get worn out aren't thrown away, but stored at a shrine until it decomposes. Other than in Lalish, these shrines are located in Shingal at Pir Akhayi shrine and in Qibare, Kurd dagh at Melek Adî shrine. Feqirs, symbolizing religious purity, don't shave their beards and they also participate in many ceremonies, including Tewaf and Cêjna Cemaiya at the procession where they represent Sheikh Adi. Feqirs are highly respected and in their communities, may deal with mediation and reconciliation. Even the clergy and the mukhtar obey their rulings and whenever they enter a room while wearing their kherqe, everyone is required to stand up to greet and pay him respects, including the Mîr and the elderly.

Qewal 
Qewals are a hereditary group of performers of Yazidi religious hymns who come traditionally from two tribes of Mirîds: Dumilî and Hekarî. However, more recently, there are also some Qewals who are from the Mamûsî tribe. Qewals are the main individuals that are responsible for the preservation and transmission of Yazidi religious texts. The centre of Qewals is traditionally considered to be the two villlages of Bashiqa and Bahzani, where, according to oral history, schools of Qewals existed until the beginning of 20th century. Children from Qewal families were sent to these schools to be taught the religious texts and learn to play the sacred musical instruments of def and şibab. Despite the role of Qewals however, the task of memorising, transmitting and explaining religious texts is not carried out exclusively by Qewals, but also by the knowledgeable representatives of the priestly castes of Pîrs and Sheikhs, the Feqîrs, Koçeks and various "Qewlbêjs" from the Mirîd caste.

Qewals gained prominence especially owing to their role in the Tawûsgêran ceremony, in which they visit different Yazidi communities in various regions with the sacred effigy of Tawûs (Sencaq), perform and recite religious texts, teach them to interested people, exchange news and collect the religious donations for Lalish. Qewals also recite religious texts at big Yazidi feasts celebrated in Lalish. For example, during Sema ceremony at the Feast of the Assembly, five Qewals sit (while others who are present at the ceremony are to stand) near the procession and play with the sacred instruments; two Qewals of the Hekarî tribe sit on the right and play the şibab while the three other Qewals, who hail from the Dumilî tribe, sit on the left and play with the def while chanting the religious hymns.

Mirids (Mirîdxane)

The Mirids (Mirîdxane) are laymen.

Women

Fakra

As Fakra (other spellings: Fekra, Fekhra, Fakhra, Fahra) the members of a Yazidi women's order are called. Only Yazidi women who are virgins and who have chosen a chaste and ascetic life can be accepted as members of this women's order. The Fakra are responsible for the maintenance of the Yazidi temple Lalish. Kebanî ("mistress of the house") is called the head of the Yazidi women's order.

Kebani
Kebani ("mistress of the house") are members of a Yazidi women's order in Lalish who hold the highest position within the women's order. Kebani is the highest female rank within the Yazidi hierarchy that a woman can achieve. The rank is determined by the most deserving order members.

Mijewir
Mijewir is the title of the custodian of a local shrine, cemetery and to a lesser extent, preservation of a religious instruction or knowledge. Mijewirs come normally from Sheikh or Pir castes, but Feqirs may also hold this office. A Mijewir often officiates at a funeral and organizes local events, namely religious festivals and the annual village Tiwaf, a Mijewir also has the duty of receiving and hosting Qawwals during Tiwaf, reciting religious prose and qewls to the locals during evening sessions. Meanwhile, a mukhtar or a village elder is often in charge of the government or official matters, a Mijewir is responsible for the religious affairs.

Other roles
A sibling of the hereafter (birayê, xuşka, axiretê) is a lifelong spiritual "brother" or "sister," typically from a Sheikh lineage. The sibling of the hereafter is assigned to a Yazidi man or woman starting from adolescence, and helps him or her go through rites of passage such as weddings. The spiritual sibling is supposed to help the person safely reach the next world after their death.

A mirebbi is a hereditary teacher in Yazidi society. Although a mirebbi may belong to any caste, he must belong to the same lineage as his disciple.

An osta or hosta is a teacher of qewls (sacred hymns). The role is not hereditary and is not restricted to any caste.

A keriv or kerif is a godfather in Yazidi society. He is the man on whose knees a boy has been circumcised. The keriv serves as an important social link between families.

See also
Gathering of the spiritual
List of Yazidi saints

References 

 
Yazidi religion